The Baggio Cemetery (Italian: Cimitero di Baggio, Lombard: Cimiteri de Bagg) is a cemetery which serve the zone of Baggio, a borough which used to be an autonomous city until 1923. It has a section for non Catholic people, one for fallen in the WWI and a Church. Since 2006 it has the first Italian funeral home which can be used to non Catholic funerals or to help the death's relatives.

References 
 Cimiteri Comunali – Milano
 Inaugurata di fronte al cimitero di Baggio la prima casa funeraria d'Italia

External links
 

Cemeteries in Milan